Theta is the eighth Greek letter, written Θ (uppercase) or θ (lowercase).

Theta may also refer to:

Science and mathematics
 Θ (set theory), the least ordinal α such that there is no surjection from the reals onto α
 Theta (gastropod), a genus of sea snails
 Theta functions, special functions of several complex variables
 Theta meson, a hypothetical meson in quantum physics
 Theta representation, a particular representation of the Heisenberg group of quantum mechanics
 Theta wave, in biology
 Theta*, a pathfinding algorithm in computer science
 , a Bachmann–Landau notation in computational complexity theory
 The denotation for potential temperature
 A common symbol for a variable of the measure of an angle
 SARS-CoV-2 Theta variant, one of the variants of SARS-CoV-2, the virus that causes COVID-19

Business
 GM Theta platform, an automobile platform of General Motors
 Theta Networks a telecommunications software company

Other uses
 Theta (finance), in quantitative finance, a first order derivative of an option pricing formula versus time
 Theta (musician), a Greek musician
 Theta (video game), a 2007 game produced by Kensuke Tanabe
 Theta role, in linguistics
 Theta, Gauteng, a suburb of Johannesburg, South Africa
 An IPA symbol for voiceless dental fricative
 Tropical Storm Theta, the record-breaking 29th named storm of the 2020 Atlantic hurricane season
Hyundai Theta engine a four cylinder gasoline engine made by Hyundai.

See also
Thetan, in Scientology, the spirit or soul